Felício Mendes João Milson (born 12 October 1999) is an Angolan footballer who plays for Turkish club Ankaragücü on loan from the Russian club Pari NN as a winger.

Club career
Milson made his professional debut with Marítimo in a Primeira Liga match with FC Porto on 10 June 2020.

On 12 February 2022, Milson signed a long-term contract with Russian Premier League club Nizhny Novgorod.

On 3 February 2023, Milson joined Ankaragücü in Turkey on loan with an option to buy.

International career
Milson represented the Angola U20s at the 2017 Toulon Tournament. Milson debuted for the senior Angola national team in a 3-0 friendly win over Mozambique on 23 October 2020.

Career statistics

References

External links
Maritimo Profile

1999 births
Footballers from Luanda
Living people
Angolan footballers
Angola international footballers
Angola under-20 international footballers
Association football fullbacks
C.S. Marítimo players
FC Nizhny Novgorod (2015) players
MKE Ankaragücü footballers
Campeonato de Portugal (league) players
Primeira Liga players
Russian Premier League players
Angolan expatriate footballers
Angolan expatriate sportspeople in Portugal
Expatriate footballers in Portugal
Angolan expatriate sportspeople in Russia
Expatriate footballers in Russia
Angolan expatriate sportspeople in Turkey
Expatriate footballers in Turkey